The 1959–60 season was Dinamo București's 11th season in Divizia A. Dinamo finished eighth in the championship, closer to relegation zone than to the title. Dinamo won only 3 of 11 home games. After the loss against Rapid in the 9th day, Iuliu Baratky was sacked and replaced by Traian Ionescu.

After the derby against CCA, won by Dinamo 2–1, both teams sent an open letter to the fans, apologising for the poor show that they offered, and promised that in the future they would play more respectable football.

Results

Transfers 
Before the start of the season Dinamo bought Haralambie Eftimie (from Dinamo Bacău). Dumitru Ivan and Lică Nunweiller are promoted from the Tineretul Dinamovist (Young Dinamo player).

References 
www.labtof.ro
www.romaniansoccer.ro

1959
Association football clubs 1959–60 season
1959–60 in Romanian football